The School of Education and Social Policy (SESP), established in 1926, is the smallest of the eight undergraduate and graduate institutions at Northwestern University, USA. Located about 12 miles north of downtown Chicago in Evanston, Illinois, SESP's curriculum focuses on the academic study of education.

Undergraduate programs

The SESP offers four concentrations leading to a bachelor’s degree:

 Human Development and Psychological Services;
 Learning and Organizational Change;
 Secondary Teaching, focusing on K-12 education;
 Social Policy.

Majors of all concentrations are required complete a junior-year unpaid internship at a relevant organization in the Greater Chicago area.

Graduate programs
The SESP offers three PhD programs: Learning Sciences, Computer Science, and Human Development and Social Policy. There are four master's degree programs: MS in Higher Education Administration and Policy, MS in education (K-12), MS in Learning and Organizational Change, and a dual degree in Applied Economics and Social and Economic Policy.

Special programs
In addition to undergraduate and graduate programs, SESP also offers a multidisciplinary program in education sciences, an interdisciplinary training program for PhD students.

Rankings
As of February 2022, U.S. News & World Report ranked SESP 8th among institutes training educators in the US.

References

External links
SESP website

Northwestern University
Schools of education in Illinois
Educational institutions established in 1926
1926 establishments in Illinois